<div style="float: right; font-size: smaller; background-color:#E6E6FA; padding: 12px; margin-left: 5em; margin-bottom: 2em; width: 180px" align="center">

13th SLGFCA Awards
December 18, 2016

Best Film: <big>La La Land</big>

Best Director: Damien ChazelleLa La Land

</div>
The nominees for the 13th St. Louis Film Critics Association Awards were announced on December 12, 2016. The winners announced on December 18 2016.
Winners, runners-up and nominees

Best Film
 La La Land Runner-up (tie): Hell or High Water Runner-up (tie): Manchester by the Sea Arrival MoonlightBest Actor
 Casey Affleck - Manchester by the Sea
 Runner-up: Joel Edgerton - Loving
 Ryan Gosling - La La Land Tom Hanks - Sully Viggo Mortensen - Captain FantasticBest Supporting Actor
 Mahershala Ali - Moonlight
 Runner-up: Lucas Hedges - Manchester by the Sea
 Jeff Bridges - Hell or High Water Dev Patel - Lion Michael Shannon - Nocturnal AnimalsBest Original Screenplay
 Hell or High Water - Taylor Sheridan Runner-up: Manchester by the Sea - Kenneth Lonergan La La Land - Damien Chazelle
 Loving - Jeff Nichols
 Moonlight - Barry Jenkins

Best Cinematography
 La La Land - Linus Sandgren Runner-up: Moonlight - James Laxton Arrival - Bradford Young
 Café Society - Vittorio Storaro
 Hail, Caesar! - Roger Deakins

Best Editing
 Jackie - Sebastián Sepúlveda Runner-up (tie): Hacksaw Ridge - John Gilbert Runner-up (tie): La La Land - Tom Cross Moonlight - Joi McMillon and Nat Sanders
 Nocturnal Animals - Joan Sobel

Best Production Design
 The Handmaiden - Seong-hee Ryu Runner-up (tie): Fantastic Beasts and Where to Find Them - Stuart Craig and James Hambidge Runner-up (tie): Jackie - Jean Rabasse 
 Runner-up (tie): La La Land - David Wasco
 Hail, Caesar! - Jess Gonchor

Best Horror / Science-Fiction Film
 The Witch
 Runner-up: Arrival
 10 Cloverfield Lane
 Doctor Strange
 Don't Breathe

Best Foreign Language Film
 Elle
 Runner-up: The Handmaiden
 A Man Called Ove
 Our Little Sister
 Toni Erdmann

Best Animated Feature
 Zootopia
 Runner-up: Kubo and the Two Strings
 April and the Extraordinary World
 Finding Dory
 Moana

Best Scene
 La La Land - Opening dance number, "Another Day of Sun." Runner-up: Hail, Caesar! - "Would that it were so simple." Captain America: Civil War - Battle at the Leipzig/Halle Airport.
 Deadpool - Opening credits.
 Manchester by the Sea - Lee (Casey Affleck) and Randi (Michelle Williams) meet on the street.

Best Director
 Damien Chazelle - La La Land
 Runner-up (tie): Kenneth Lonergan - Manchester by the Sea
 Runner-up (tie): Denis Villeneuve - Arrival
 Barry Jenkins - Moonlight
 David Mackenzie - Hell or High Water

Best Actress
 Isabelle Huppert - Elle
 Runner-up: Natalie Portman - Jackie
 Amy Adams - Arrival
 Ruth Negga - Loving
 Emma Stone - La La Land

Best Supporting Actress
 Viola Davis - Fences
 Runner-up: Michelle Williams - Manchester by the Sea
 Lily Gladstone - Certain Women
 Greta Gerwig - 20th Century Women
 Naomie Harris - Moonlight

Best Adapted Screenplay
 Love & Friendship - Whit Stillman (Screenplay); Jane Austen (Novel) Runner-up: Arrival - Eric Heisserer (Screenplay); Ted Chiang (Short Story) Fences - August Wilson (Screenplay and Play)
 Lion  - Luke Davies (Screenplay); Saroo Brierley with Larry Buttrose (Book)
 Nocturnal Animals - Tom Ford (Screenplay); Austin Wright (Novel)

Best Visual Effects
 The Jungle Book
 Runner-up: Doctor Strange
 Arrival
 La La Land
 A Monster Calls

Best Music Score
 La La Land - Justin Hurwitz Runner-up: Jackie - Mica Levi Arrival - Jóhann Jóhannsson
 Moonlight - Nicholas Britell
 The Neon Demon - Cliff Martinez

Best Soundtrack
 Sing Street
 Runner-up: La La Land
 Everybody Wants Some!!
 Moana
 Trolls

Best Song
 "Audition (The Fools Who Dream)" - La La Land
 Runner-up: "City of Stars" - La La Land
 "How Far I'll Go" - Moana
 "You're Welcome" - Moana
 "Drive It Like You Stole It" - Sing Street

Best Documentary Feature
 I Am Not Your Negro
 Runner-up: Weiner
 De Palma
 The Eagle Huntress
 Gleason

Best Comedy
 Hail, Caesar!
 Runner-up: Popstar: Never Stop Never Stopping
 Deadpool
 Don't Think Twice
 Florence Foster Jenkins

Best Action Film
 Captain America: Civil War
 Runner-up: Doctor Strange
 Deadpool
 Hacksaw Ridge
 Jason Bourne

Multiple nominations and awards

These films had multiple nominations:
 14 nominations:  La La Land
 8 nominations:  Arrival, Moonlight
 7 nominations:  Manchester by the Sea
 4 nominations:  Hell or High Water, Jackie
 3 nominations:  Deadpool, Doctor Strange, Loving
 2 nominations:  Lion

References

External links
 Official website

2016
2016 film awards
2016 in Missouri
St Louis